Bhilai Institute of Technology (BIT) is the first self-financed engineering college in Central India. Established in 1986, it was affiliated to Chhattisgarh Swami Vivekanand Technical University.

History
Commissioning of the Bhilai Steel Plant at Bhilai in 1959 necessitated having suitably trained and skilled personnel to perform specific technical tasks at the plant. Seeing this need, various organizations, industrialists, charitable institutions and philanthropic societies of the region took an initiative to establish an engineering institution, and to this end, a trust was formed and registered. The Government of Madhya Pradesh accorded the permission to open a self-supporting and self-financing engineering institute, and thus, in July 1986, the Bhilai Institute of Technology came into existence.

Seth Balkrishan was a philanthropist and a key founding member of BIT. His contribution in the fields of education, sports, social advancement, and the spiritual needs of the community are seen as legendary in Bhilai and the neighboring regions. The institute is therefore dedicated to him.

BIT-Durg was established in 1986, it was affiliated to Pandit Ravishankar Shukla University, Raipur and started offering Bachelor of Engineering in Civil Engineering, Electrical Engineering, Electronics and Telecommunication and Mechanical Engineering with an intake capacity of 180 students. Over the years it started offering Computer Science and Engineering and Master of Business Administration (1998), Master of Computer Applications (1999), Information Technology (2000) and Electrical and Electronics (2006). In 2005, Institute got affiliated to newly formed Chhattisgarh Swami Vivekanand Technical University, Bhilai. On 16 July 2020, it became the first engineering college in Chhattisgarh to be awarded with Autonomous status.

Location

The institute is located at the threshold of Durg city beside NH-53 (GE Road) in Chhattisgarh, India. Its proximity to Durg bus depot and Durg railway station facilitates fast commuting. Additionally, it is connected to each and every corner of Bhilai-Durg agglomeration through various means of transportation such as minibuses, auto rickshaw etc.

Academics
The Programmes offered by the institute can be broadly classified as follows:
 Undergraduate programmes
 Postgraduate programmes
 Doctorate programmes

All the Undergraduate Programmes are full-time courses, whereas Postgraduate Programmes involve both full-time and part-time courses. It offers Bachelor of Technology (B.Tech) in Civil Engineering, Electrical and Electronics Engineering, Mechanical Engineering, Computer Science Engineering, Information Technology etc.

Apart from this, for the purpose of promoting higher studies and research, the institute has research centres in the fields of Civil Engineering, Electrical and Electronics Engineering, Mechanical Engineering, Engineering Mathematics, Environmental Engineering, and Engineering Chemistry.

The Institute admits undergraduate students through CGPET and JEE-Main.

The Institute admits MCA students through AIMCET, MBA students through MAT and M.E/M.Tech students through GATE.

Campus

The institute has 5 blocks:
 Administrative block, holding offices of various administrative departments and the central library
 ECOMIT block, holds three departments Electronics, Computer and Information Technology, as well as the central computer lab
 Mechanical Engineering Block
 Electrical Engineering|Electrical/Civil Engineering Block
 Engineering Sciences and Management Block, including facilities for research in basic sciences

There is also an auditorium and an open-air theater which host various cultural programmes and national and local seminars.

Open-Air Theater
The Open Air Theater of BIT is used for hosting several activities like skits, dramas, renditions, festivals, competitions, seminars, Annual function etc.

Auditorium
The Auditorium of BIT was inaugurated in 2006. From then on it is responsible for hosting seminars, music shows and other activities. BITCON, the national conference is hosted in the Auditorium.

Sports Complex

The institute has an outdoor field area of  comprising cricket, hockey and football fields and courts for volleyball, handball & basketball. The sports complex also has an athletics track of 400 metres.

Cultural activities
The colleges hosts an annual national level techno-cultural fest called Ojas. It also takes place in the state level cultural, technical and sports competition conducted by the University. the local SPICMACAY chapter also organizes various annual programmes. Other activities ae organized by the Vista club and the astro and clicks club. It also has National level clubs like the National Service Scheme having the aim of "development of the personality of students through community service". It was established in the year 1986 under Pt. RSU, Raipur then transferred to CSVTU, Bhilai in 2006.

References

External links

 

Private engineering colleges in India
Durg
Engineering colleges in Chhattisgarh
Educational institutions established in 1986
1986 establishments in Madhya Pradesh